Giuseppe Zigaina ( 2 April 1924 – 16 April 2015) was an Italian neorealist painter and an author.

Life and career

Born in Cervignano del Friuli, Udine, as a child Zigaina showed an early propensity for drawing. He studied at the College of Tolmino, and at 19 he held his first exhibition. In 1946 he met Pier Paolo Pasolini, with whom he established a solid artistic collaboration which included the illustration of some books and the involvement in some films as an actor and as a writer. After the death of Pasolini Zigaina wrote several books about his art.

After winning the Fontanesi Prize at the Venice Biennale in 1950, Zigaina's works were  gradually influenced by the German New Objectivity. Starting from 1965 he eventually adopted the technique of engraving, which became gradually distinctive of his artistic production. In 1984 Zigaina moved to San Francisco to teach at the Art Institute.

References

External links 
 

1924 births
2015 deaths
People from the Province of Udine
20th-century Italian painters
20th-century Italian male artists
Italian male painters
21st-century Italian painters
San Francisco Art Institute faculty
Italian essayists
Italian male non-fiction writers
Male essayists
Italian engravers
21st-century Italian male artists
20th-century engravers